Kerry Ellis is a self-titled studio album by actress and singer Kerry Ellis which was released on 14 September 2014. It featured "songs from my recent stage show at the London Palladium including standards, musical favourites, the odd Queen song and some new compositions"

Track listing

References

External links

Kerry Ellis Web – a fan website

2014 albums
Kerry Ellis albums